Locastra ardua is a species of snout moth in the genus Locastra. It was described by Charles Swinhoe in 1902, and is known from Fiji, including Nausori.

References

Moths described in 1902
Epipaschiinae